Mark Wheatley may refer to:
 Mark Wheatley (politician)
 Mark Wheatley (comics)